Samuel Solomonovich Koteliansky (Самуил Соломонович Котелянский) (February 28, 1880 – January 21, 1955) was a Ukrainian  translator of Russian literature into English. He made the transition from his origins in a small Jewish shtetl to distinction in the rarefied world of English letters. Although he was not a creative writer himself, he befriended, corresponded with, helped publish, and otherwise served as intermediary between some of the most prominent people in English literary life in the early twentieth century.

Biography
Koteliansky was born in the small Jewish shtetl (town) of Ostropol in the Volhynian Governorate of the Russian Empire (today in Khmelnytskyi Oblast, western Ukraine), where his first language almost certainly was Yiddish.  The name Koteliansky, according to his biographer Galya Diment, most likely comes from a small town near Ostropol called Kotelianka. He was educated and attended university in Russia.

By 1911, financed by his mother, Beila, he had moved to London, where he became a great friend of D.H. Lawrence, and Leonard and Virginia Woolf. He also adored the short-story writer Katherine Mansfield. Although his romantic affection for her was not reciprocated, the two maintained a close relationship in person and in letters until her early death in 1923. His friendship with her was also documented in a painting by  Beatrice Elvery, Lady Glenavy.

He was business manager of The Adelphi, a prominent literary journal that published works of Lawrence, Mansfield, the young Dylan Thomas, and many other leading lights of early- and mid-twentieth-century English letters after its founding in 1923. But Koteliansky eventually broke with the journal's founder (and Katherine Mansfield's husband) John Middleton Murry. He was an early translator into English (often with the collaboration of Leonard or Virginia Woolf) of works of Russian authors, such as Dostoevsky, Chekhov, and Rozanov, and he helped those authors achieve prominence in the English-speaking world.

Koteliansky ('Kot') was a close friend of the artist Mark Gertler, and they corresponded extensively from 1914 until Gertler's death in 1939.

References

External links

 Galya Diment: A Russian Jew of Bloomsbury : the life and times of Samuel Koteliansky, Montréal [u.a.] : McGill-Queen's University Press, 2011, 
 
 
 
 

1880s births
1955 deaths
Russian–English translators
Ukrainian Jews
20th-century translators
Ukrainian-Jewish emigrants to the United Kingdom
People from Khmelnytskyi Oblast
Translators from the Russian Empire
Ukrainian translators
Emigrants from the Russian Empire to the United Kingdom